Shrirampur is a city in Ahmednagar district in Maharashtra, India.
 
Shrirampur may also refer to:
 Serampore, a city in Hooghly district, West Bengal, India
 Srirampur, Burdwan, a census town in Purba Bardhaman district, West Bengal, India
 Shrirampur, Paschim Medinipur, a village in Paschim Medinipur district, West Bengal, India
 Shrirampur, Arambagh, a village in Pursurah CD block, Arambagh Subdivision, Hooghly district, West Bengal, India